Chief Abiola Dosunmu (formerly Dosunmu-Elegbede-Fernandez, born 29 July 1947), is a Nigerian businesswoman, socialite and traditional aristocrat. In addition to a variety of other chieftaincy titles, she currently holds that of the Erelu Kuti IV of Lagos.

Early life
Abiola Dosunmu was born in Kano on 29 July 1947, into the royal family of Omoba Adewunmi and Olori Adejoke Dosunmu of Lagos Island. She is a direct descendant of Oba Dosunmu of Lagos, and is therefore of both royal Yoruba and royal Bini origins. Her maternal grandmother was an Iyalode of the Owu Egba.

The Erelu Kuti IV of Lagos 
Abiola Dosunmu was made the Erelu Kuti IV of Lagos by her relative Oba Adeyinka Oyekan of Lagos in 1980. In this capacity she serves as the ceremonial queen mother, and reigns as regent of Lagos upon the death of an incumbent monarch until a substantive successor is chosen by the college of kingmakers. She has since served as Erelu Kuti for most of her life and holds a position that only princesses from the ruling houses can attain.

Chiefly roles and responsibilities

In Lagos
The Erelu Kuti of Lagos' official duties include:
 Being a close confidant of the  traditional rulers of Lagos. 
 Being an adviser on all social matters, such as the conferment of traditional and honorary chieftaincy titles.
 Being the traditional leader of the Lagos women's organisations (such as the market guilds).
 Being a member of the kingmakers' council.

Elsewhere
 Being a member of the Ogboni in Egbaland

Competing claim to title
A woman with the same name as Dosunmu made claims to the Erelu Kuti's title. She died in 2019.

Business career 

Dosunmu studied business administration in London. She is also said to have "revolutionized the traditional Aso Oke business to become the multi-million dollar industry it is today". Abiola Dosunmu promoted the culture of the Yoruba people in Nigeria through the Aso Oke. She later served as the interior decorator of the Nigerian High Commission in London. She also opened a shop on Bond Street in London.

Influence 
The Erelu, a fashion trend consisting of a skirt and short agbada worn by women in the 80s and early 90s, is also credited to Abiola Dosunmu. Nigerian musician King Sunny Adé wrote a song honouring Dosunmu titled "Biibire Kose Fowora".

Honours and recognition 
 National honour of the Royal Kingdom of Belgium.
 Life achievement award by Vanguard newspaper
 Honorary Doctorate Degree, D.Cul-Doctor of Culture at the 4th convocation ceremony of Igbinedion University, Okada.
 Pan African Exemplary Leadership 2016 Honour /Icon of True Silent Mega Philanthropist in Africa - In recognition and appreciation of her immense contribution to Nation building, massive job creation, consistent assistance to the less privileged, excellent mentorship towards youths, youth employment, public service delivery with integrity in her discharge of duty, Promotion and Preservation of African culture and values including her selfless service to God, Humanity, Nigeria and Africa.
 The Commonwealth Journalists Association Award.
 Nigerian Institute of International Affairs Award.
 West African Students Union Parliament Award for Exemplary Leadership.

Personal life
Dosunmu married Major Adekunle Elegbede and had two children, Kunle Elegbede and Adewunmi Elegbede. The marriage ended when Major Elegbede died in the early 1970s. Dosunmu met Chief Antonio Deinde Fernandez, an Amaro member of the Olumegbon chieftaincy family of Lagos, in 1972. At the time, Fernandez was married to an American woman. Dosunmu and Fernandez were married in Nigeria at the Palace of the Oba of Lagos in April 1973 in a ceremony attended by famous Nigerians including Admiral Adekunle Lawal. They had one child, a daughter named Antoinette Oyinkansola Fernandez, who is a London-based writer and filmmaker. In 2007, Dosunmu was publicly ordered by Fernandez to stop using his surname.

See also
 Alaba Lawson

References

1947 births
Living people
Nigerian women in business
Nigerian traditional rulers
Nigerian princesses
Fernandez family (Lagos)
Yoruba women in business
Yoruba women in politics
Women in Lagos politics
People from Kano
Yoruba princesses
Ologun-Kutere family